Walker Hume (born August 21, 1993) is an American soccer center-back.

Playing career

College & Amateur
Hume began playing college soccer at Rollins College in 2012, before transferring to the University of North Carolina at Chapel Hill for their 2014 season. Hume missed the entirety of the 2015 season due to injury.

While at college, Hume appeared for Austin Aztex, Midland/Odessa Sockers and Portland Timbers U23s in the Premier Development League.

Professional
On January 13, 2017, Hume was selected by FC Dallas in the second Round (37th overall) of the 2017 MLS SuperDraft. He signed with the team on February 21, 2017.

Personal
He has a twin brother, Tucker, who currently plays for United Soccer League club Nashville SC.

His grandfather is former NFL player Tom Franckhauser, who played for the Los Angeles Rams, Dallas Cowboys and Minnesota Vikings.

References

External links 
 

1993 births
Living people
American soccer players
Association football defenders
Austin Aztex players
FC Dallas draft picks
FC Dallas players
Major League Soccer players
Midland-Odessa Sockers FC players
North Carolina Tar Heels men's soccer players
Orange County SC players
People from San Angelo, Texas
Portland Timbers U23s players
Rollins Tars men's soccer players
Soccer players from Texas
American twins
Twin sportspeople
USL League Two players
USL Championship players